Jacques de l'Ange or the Monogrammist JAD ([c. 1621 – 1650) was a Flemish painter and draughtsman known for his genre scenes and history paintings executed in a Caravaggesque style.  The artist was only rediscovered in the mid-1990s as his work was previously attributed to other Northern Caravaggists and in particular the Utrecht School Caravaggists or Flemish Carravagists.

Life

Very little is known about the life of Jacques de l'Ange.  It is not clear whether he should be identified with the genre and history painter Jacques (Jacob) de Langhe who was recorded in Antwerp in 1632–1633 and was a pupil of Jan Cossiers. A Jacques de 'Ánge trained under Jan Cossiers and was registered as Cossiers' pupil in the Antwerp Guild of Saint Luke in the Guild year 1632-1633. Assuming he is the same Jacques de l'Ange he was likely born around 1621.  He did not register as a master of the Guild later, which indicates that he likely continued to work in his master's workshop following the completion of his apprenticeship.  Around 1640 he was able to produce some works in his own name.

He left Antwerp for Italy around 1642. No direct documentary evidence has been discovered to date as to the places in Italy that he visited.  It is likely that he spent time in Naples. Here he seems to have been influenced by the work of Matthias Stom, who had previously worked in Naples, and temporary Italian artists.

It is likely that he died around 1644 after spending only a few active years in Italy.

Work

Rediscovery and style
Jacques de l'Ange was only rediscovered in 1994 by the scholar Bernhard Schnackenburg when he was able to link the painting of the Holy Family in the Noordbrabants Museum in 's-Hertogenbosch signed with the monogram JAD to a number of other Caravaggesque paintings. Previously Jacques de l'Ange was only known as the 'Monogrammist JAD' because he signed his paintings with just these initials.<ref name=mam>Catherine Sawinski, From the Collection–Jacques de l’Ange’s 'Gluttony''', Posted on 20 February 2012 at the Milwaukee Art Museum site</ref>

Prior to his rediscovery, de l'Ange's compositions had been attributed to other painters principally from the Utrecht School, such as Gerard van Honthorst and Joachim Sandrart. His works also show a close relationship with the work of the Netherlandish painter Matthias Stom who is known to have worked in Naples where he produced a number of candle-lit scenes which clearly influenced de l'Ange.  De l'Ange also shows a preference for scenes lit by candles or torches and when he renounces these devices, he achieves a similar light contrast by placing in the foreground figures in the shadow which are set off against the brighter central and background portions of the composition. The confusion with these other painters was likely caused by the fact that like them Jacques de l'Ange painted in a style influenced by Caravaggio. De l'Ange’s master Jan Cossiers also started out as a follower of Caravaggio whose work Cossiers may have studied during a stay in Rome.

Other characteristics of his style are his individualised facial types, bright palette and loose and bright brush technique. His style and subject matter are clearly influenced by the Antwerp school, and in particular Rubens, van Dyck and Jordaens along with Adriaen Brouwer. Brouwer's designs for a series of The Seven Deadly Sins engraved by Lucas Vorsterman the Elder was of importance for his own series on this subject. He interprets these influences in a personal manner.  His style was further formed in Italy through the influence of Matthias Stom and Italian Caravaggisti of the mid 17th century.

History painting
The compositions currently ascribed to de l’Ange include religious and mythological subjects as well as historical subjects and allegorical genre scenes.  Examples of the former include the Chained Prometheus (Lempertz, 19 May 2007, Cologne, lot 1085) and The Holy Family (Noordbrabants Museum, 's-Hertogenbosch).  The latter composition has been ascribed previously to Abraham van Diepenbeeck and Pieter van Lint. His history paintings further include the Martyrdom of St Dymphna and St Gerebernus (Staatsgalerie im neuen Schloss Schleissheim, Oberschleissheim), formerly attributed to Gerard Seghers and two versions of the Death of Seneca (private collections), one of which was formerly attributed to 'Circle of Matthias Stom.Attributed to Monogrammist JAD, Seneca's suicid: at Nero's order he cuts his veins, sitting in a basin of water, and then takes a dose of poison, Dorotheum (Vienna) 2011-12-12, lot 100 at the Netherlands Institute for Art History

Seven deadly sins
Jacques de l'Ange is mainly known for his series of seven genre paintings depicting the Seven deadly sins.  He executed various copies of the series attesting to the popularity of the subject at the time. They are kept, amongst others, in the Hermitage Museum, the Milwaukee Art Museum, the Museumslandschaft Hessen Kassel and the Musée du Séminaire (Quebec).  On its website, the Hermitage still attributes the Allegory of Vanity to Joachim Sandrart. Another painting in the series of deadly sins depicting 'Lust' has been identified in the collection of the Reggio Emilia, Galleria Parmiggiani, where it had been attributed to Joachim Sandrart and Matthias Stom.Allegoria: la Lussuria (gli amanti) at the website of the Comune di Reggio Emilia, consulted on 16 January 2016 

The Ashmolean Museum has a complete set of the seven compositions executed on copper.  Some of these are believed to have been painted by Jacques de l'Ange as small-scale ricordi after completion of the series around 1642 and others may be designs for the larger paintings. It is not clear whether all large paintings in the series were completed.

Like other followers of Caravaggio, de l’Ange used light, usually from a single source, to create dramatic effect.  For instance in his composition representing Gluttony'' he placed a candle on the right-hand side of the composition to create dramatic, almost theater-like shadows.  As a result, the scene emerges from the dark background and gains depth as the modelling of the figures is accentuated.

References

External links

Flemish Baroque painters
Flemish history painters
Flemish genre painters
Artists from Antwerp
Painters from Antwerp
Caravaggisti